"Take Me Away" is a song by Australian alternative/punk rock band Lash. It was released on 19 March 2001 as the group's debut single and lead single from their album, The Beautiful and the Damned (2002). The song peaked at number 33 on the ARIA charts. 

At the ARIA Music Awards of 2001, "Take Me Away" was nominated for ARIA Award for Breakthrough Artist – Single.

The song was covered by actress Christina Vidal for the 2003 Disney film Freaky Friday and its soundtrack. Lash also contributed their following single "Beauty Queen" for the film's soundtrack.

Track listing
 "Take Me Away" – 3:37
 "Aloha Mr Hand" – 2:25

Charts

Release history

References

External links
 

2001 debut singles
2001 songs 
Australian pop songs
Songs written by Andrew Klippel